James McGrigor Allan (1827, Bristol - 1916, Epsom) was a British anthropologist and writer.

Biography
McGrigor was the son of Colin Allan, at one time chief medical officer of Halifax, Nova Scotia, and Jane Gibbon. He opposed women's right to vote and argued that universal suffrage would cause the disruption of domestic ties, the desecration of marriage and the dissolution of the family. He attributed the agitation for equal rights to the problem of the "superfluous women" on account of emigration and the growing objection of middle and upper-class men to marriage.

He was member of the Anthropological Society of London. His younger brother was the poet Peter John Allan.

Works
Fiction
 (1857). Ernest Basil.
 (1858). Grins and Wrinkles.
 (1862). The Cost of a Coronet. 
 (1862). The Last Days of a Bachelor: An Autobiography.
 (1863). Nobly False: A Novel.
 (1864). Father Stirling.
 (1887). The Wild Curate.
 (1888). A Lady's Four Perils: A Novel.
 (1903). Where Lies her Charm?

Non-fiction
 (1860). The Intellectual Severance of Men and Women.
 (1890). Woman Suffrage, Wrong in Principle, and Practice: An Essay.

Selected articles
 (1866). "On the Ape-Origin of Mankind," The Popular Magazine of Anthropology 1 (4), pp. 121–128.
 (1868). "Europeans and their Descendants in North America," Journal of the Anthropological Society of London 6, pp. cxxvi-clxvii.
 (1869). "On the Real Differences in the Minds of Men and Women," Journal of the Anthropological Society of London 7, pp. cxcv-ccxix.
 (1870). "A Protest Against Woman's Demand for the Privileges of both Sexes," Victoria Magazine 15, pp. 318–356.

Miscellany
 (1853). "Biographical Notice of the Author," in The Poetical Remains of Peter John Allan. London: Smith, Elder & Co.

References

Further reading
 Rogers, Katharine M. (1966). Troublesome Helpmate: A History of Misogyny in Literature. Seattle: University of Washington Press, pp. 219–21, 225.
 Theroux, Alexander (1981). "The Misogynist's Library," in Darconville's Cat. New York: Doubleday & Company, pp. 442–451.

External links
 

1827 births
1916 deaths
Anti-suffragists
British anthropologists
19th-century English novelists
20th-century English novelists
Male critics of feminism
Victorian novelists
Race and intelligence controversy
English male novelists
Writers from Bristol